The 2018 Lashio bombing was a bomb blast in the town of Lashio, in northern Shan State, Myanmar, that killed two employees of Yoma Bank and injured 22 others.

Background 
Bombings are not uncommon in Shan State, where there is an ongoing conflict between the government of Myanmar and various insurgent groups. However, bombings tend to be small-scale and civilian casualties are rare.

Bombing 
At around 4:30 pm (MMT) on 21 February 2018, a bomb exploded between two banks, Yoma Bank and Aya Bank, immediately killing two employees of the former. Twenty-two others were injured in the blast.

Aftermath 
On 23 February 2018, the government of Shan State announced it would compensate victims of the bombing, offering 500,000 kyats ($375 USD) to the families of the two deceased and 200,000 to 300,000 kyats to those injured.

References 

2018 murders in Myanmar
February 2018 crimes in Asia
Internal conflict in Myanmar
Murder in Myanmar
Terrorist incidents in Asia in 2018
Terrorist incidents in Myanmar